The Reunification Movement for Change (sometimes written as the Reunification of Movements for Change) is a political party in Vanuatu resulting from a split in the Union of Moderate Parties in 2012. At the 2016 election the party won 3.44% of the vote and 3 seats, resulting in its leader Charlot Salwai being appointed Prime Minister. The party managed also to be included in he governing coalitions that emerged from the two following elections, in 2020 and 2022, where it won 7 and 5 seats respectively.

Election results

See also
:Category:Reunification Movement for Change politicians

References

Political parties in Vanuatu
Political parties established in 2012
2012 establishments in Vanuatu